Freerunner is a 2011 action film by Lawrence Silverstein starring Sean Faris, Danny Dyer and Tamer Hassan in lead roles.

Plot
Freerunner sees eight freerunners racing against time, to scan a collar on three check points across the city area within an hour. Each collar is fitted with an explosive which will detonate if they leave the green race zone, are the last runner to scan a checkpoint more than three seconds after the previous racer, or if the race owner, Mr. Frank (Dyer), manually detonates via remote device. The winner of the race is the first to make it to the final checkpoint within 60 minutes and will receive a prize of million dollars. The losers will all die.

The runners are chosen after performing in the local, non-lethal, races. Ryan (Faris), Kid Elvis, Mitch, Decks, Turk, West, Freebo and Finch are the eight runners chosen against their will to participate. International gangsters and businessmen place bets on the runners, before and throughout the race. Race activity is monitored by cameras throughout the race area and on each racer's collar.

Cast
Sean Faris as Ryan
Danny Dyer as Mr. Frank
Tamer Hassan as Reese
Amanda Fuller as Dalores
Seymour Cassel as Grampa
Mariah Bonner as Deedee
Casey Durkin as Stacey
Ryan Doyle as Finch
Dylan W. Baker as West
Rebecca Da Costa as Chelsea

Release
Frerunners was released in Germany on 15 September 2011 at Oldenburg International Film Festival. The film became available on DVD and Blu-ray in October 18, 2011.

DVD
DVD extra includes behind-the-scenes footage, a making-of featurette, a look at the stunts and fights, and some on-set B-roll featuring the actors playing a game called ninja and engaging in random Parkour.

Soundtrack
 Let Us In! (Come On) – The Lions Rampant
 Panther 1 – Slowride
 At The Edgewater – Johnny Douglas
 Caught Up In The Chase – Billy Livesay
 Are You Ready For This – Kritical
 Aloha vey – The Code
 Final Hour Groove – Steve Kornicki
 Oily Rags – Grant Fitch
 Fast Lane – Freak i.v.
 Back To My Old Habits – Rhiann Holly
 Last Stand of Cornholio the Wicked – Grant Fitch
 That’s The Way It’s Got To Be – Martin Guigui
  Psycho Creep – Mark Cook
 Bein’ Blue – Cassidy Cooper
 Rocket Lab – Andrew Jed
 Get A Real Woman – Amber (Church Of Disco mix)
 Counter – Peter Groenwald
 Lover Tonight – Joe Wolfe
 End Run – Peter DiStefano
 Harp Angel – CT Sox
 Engergise – Earodynamics
 Bullets – Protillus

References

External links
 

2011 films
2011 action films
Parkour in film
American chase films
American action films
American dystopian films
Films shot in Cleveland
Films about television
Films set in the future
Films about death games
2010s chase films
2010s English-language films
2010s American films